Ertil is a town and the administrative center of Ertilsky District in Voronezh Oblast, Russia, located on the Ertil River (Don's basin),  east of Voronezh, the administrative center of the oblast. Population:

History
It was founded in 1897 as a settlement around a sugar plant. It was granted town status in 1963.

Administrative and municipal status
Within the framework of administrative divisions, Ertil serves as the administrative center of Ertilsky District. As an administrative division, it is, together with eight rural localities in Ertilsky District, incorporated within Ertilsky District as Ertil Urban Settlement. As a municipal division, this administrative unit also has urban settlement status and is a part of Ertilsky Municipal District.

Culture
There is a museum of local lore in the town.

References

Notes

Sources

External links

Official website of Ertil 
Ertil Business Directory 

Cities and towns in Voronezh Oblast